is a private university in the city of Ichinomiya, Aichi, Japan, established in 2008.

Undergraduate program
Faculty of Health and Nutrition
Department of Nutrition
Faculty of Nursing
Department of Nursing

External links
 Official website 

Educational institutions established in 2008
Private universities and colleges in Japan
Universities and colleges in Aichi Prefecture
Ichinomiya, Aichi
2008 establishments in Japan